Yew Hong Kheng (born 1 February 1992) is a Malaysian male badminton player. He started playing badminton at the primary school when he was 10. In 2008, he won the gold medal at the 2008 Commonwealth Youth Games in Pune, India. He won the boys' doubles title at the 2010 BWF World Junior Championships partnered with Ow Yao Han, and in 2011, he joined the Malaysia national badminton team. In 2015, he won the Iran Fajr International tournament in the men's doubles event with Tai An Khang. In December 2015, he quit from the Badminton Association of Malaysia (BAM).

Achievements

BWF World Junior Championships
Boys' Doubles

Asia Junior Championships
Boys' Doubles

BWF International Challenge/Series
Men's Doubles

 BWF International Challenge tournament
 BWF International Series tournament
 BWF Future Series tournament

References

External links 
 

Living people
1992 births
Sportspeople from Penang
Malaysian male badminton players
Malaysian sportspeople of Chinese descent
21st-century Malaysian people